Simon Jonathon Gallup (born 1 June 1960) is an English musician and bassist with the alternative rock band The Cure. He is the second longest-serving member of the band after lead vocalist/guitarist Robert Smith.

Early years 
Born in Duxhurst, Surrey, Simon's family moved to Horley in 1961 where he attended Horley Infants and Junior Schools until 1971, followed by Oakwood secondary school to 1976. Between 1976 and 1978 he worked in a plastics factory and became the bass player for local punk band Lockjaw, who later evolved into the Magazine Spies (1979–1980), also known as the Mag/Spys.  Lockjaw and the Mag/Spys played regular live shows with Easy Cure and later the Cure between 1977 and 1979, and after collaborating in the studio on the Cult Hero recording sessions in October 1979, both Gallup and keyboardist Matthieu Hartley left the Mag/Spys to join the Cure. Former Mag/Spys Gallup, Hartley and Stuart Curran later performed together under the name of the Cry and later Fools Dance during Gallup's hiatus from the Cure between 1982 and 1984.

Career

The Cure
Gallup first joined the Cure in 1979, replacing Michael Dempsey on bass guitar. He also has been credited for occasionally playing the keyboards, particularly after Matthieu Hartley's departure in 1980. He took over keyboard lines for many of the songs that Hartley played. Examples of songs he played keyboard on live include "At Night", "A Forest", "A Strange Day" and "Pornography". During "Cold" he multi-tasked playing bass guitar and bass pedals.

On the Swing Tour in 1996, he played twelve-string acoustic guitar on "This Is a Lie".  On the Dream Tour in 2000 he played a Fender Bass VI on "There Is No If".

Gallup is also credited with singing lead vocals for a demo for "Violin Song". Gallup first performed on the Cure albums that make up "The Dark Trilogy": Seventeen Seconds, Faith, and Pornography.

Departure from the Cure
During the Pornography Tour in 1982, a series of incidents prompted Gallup to leave the Cure, including an incident on 27 May 1982 after a live performance at Hall Tivoli, Strasbourg, France when he got into a fist fight with Robert Smith at a nightclub in Strasbourg reportedly over a bar tab.

Gallup has said that "I was about to leave when some guy came up and told me I hadn't paid for my drinks. He thought I was Robert. I was knackered but the bloke took me up to the bar and Robert appeared to see what was going on. I hit him, he responded and we had a fight".

Smith, on the other hand, said that "I was on the first floor of this club when they came up and told me there was a problem downstairs. Simon was so wound up that no-one could talk to him - he was screaming at the barman, this young kid who was nearly in tears. By himself, Simon would have never behaved like that but he was surrounded by the road crew so he was behaving the way he thought a rock and roller ought to behave.
He didn't want to pay for his drinks because he thought I wasn't paying for mine. I told him to shut up and he punched me. It was the first time he really laid into me, we had an enormous ruck and I said 'That's it', walked out, got a cab back to the hotel, got my suitcase, my passport from the tour manager's room and got on the first flight to London. That was at 6.30 am and I was home by half past 10. I left a note saying I wasn't coming back. Simon returned the same afternoon. I'd left so I suppose he thought he could do the same. Good idea ... we had three days off!".

Lol Tolhurst adds that "The pressures of having to keep up the intensity and aggressive sentiments of Pornography turned Simon into someone different though, at the time, I don't think he noticed. Or didn't want to ...".

Gallup and the rest of the Cure returned to complete their Fourteen Explicit Moments Tour in support of Pornography. This tour concluded with a second incident at their 11 June 1982 live performance at Ancienne Belgique, Brussels, Belgium. Initially, at this concert, the Cure decided to play "Forever", with instrument changes; Gallup played guitar, Tolhurst played bass, Smith played the drums, and Biddles, a part-time roadie and friend of Gallup's, doing vocals. As soon as he got on stage, Biddles started improvising, singing "Smith is a wanker, Tolhurst is a wanker, only Simon is worth anything in the band! The Cure is dead!". Smith got angry and threw his drumsticks at Biddles's head, and yelled "Fuck off!".
This second incident, occurring weeks after the first notable incident, was more infamous and resulted in Gallup leaving the Cure to form Fools Dance with Biddles.

Fools Dance
Gallup left the band and started the Cry with Gary Biddles and Matthieu Hartley. Their first gig was at the Covent Garden Rock Garden on 19 April 1983, supported by SE London-based band the Wait. They later changed their name to Fools Dance, which released two EPs; Fools Dance and They'll Never Know. Biddles sang most of the songs that were released by this band, Gallup sang on one called "The Ring". When asked why he left the Cure, he said, "It's just basically that Robert and I are both really arrogant bastards, and it got to such an extreme. I suppose you just can't have two egocentrics in a band, and Robert was sort of 'the main man'."

Return to the Cure
In 1984, Smith asked Gallup to return to the Cure, an offer which he accepted. Since then, the two of them have remained on good terms. Gallup also served as best man at Smith's wedding in 1988.

In late 1992, Gallup again took a brief break from the band during the Wish Tour, after he had to be transported to hospital, suffering from pleurisy after being ill for several months. During this time, he was replaced on bass by former Associates and Shelleyan Orphan member, Roberto Soave.

On 15 August 2021 Gallup stated on his Facebook page that he had once again left the Cure. “With a slightly heavy heart I am no longer a member of the Cure! Good luck to them all” Gallup said. When responding to a fan's comment on Facebook if his departure was health related Gallup said, “I’m ok… just got fed up of betrayal.”  No official statement about Gallup's departure was made by Smith or the band. Gallup later deleted the post. In October 2021, Gallup used the same social media account to clarify that he is still a member of the band.

Gear 
Gallup's favourite bass is his Gibson Thunderbird. In 2004 Gibson created a special red Thunderbird bass for Gallup, to celebrate his 25th year as the bassist for the Cure.
He has also played Fender Precision, Fender Jazz, Rickenbacker 4001, Music Man StingRay, Washburn AB10 acoustic, Kramer acoustic, custom Dick Knight, Epiphone Jack Casady and Eccleshall 335 basses live.
In 2011 Gallup started using a Schecter signature model based on their Ultra Spitfire bass.
Gallup uses the following Boss guitar effect pedals: BF-2 Flanger, CE-5 Chorus Ensemble, MT-2 Distortion, DD-3 Digital Delay and NS-2 Noise Suppressor.
Gallup is a supporter of Reading Football Club and draped a team flag over his amp while playing in Sydney and Melbourne during the band's 2007 Australasian tour. He also draped a Reading F.C flag over his amp at Coachella 2009, during the set at Bestival 2011, Isle of Wight, during Reading Festival in 2012, Lollapalooza 2013 in Chicago, Glastonbury 2019, and the performance at The Cure's 2019 Rock and Roll Hall of Fame induction ceremony.There is also a Reading Football Club flag covering one of the large speakers of their 2013 concert held in Austin, Texas which is clearly visible on the live concert video available on YouTube.

Discography

Lockjaw
 Radio Call Sign, The Young Ones (1977), - 7" Single
 Journalist Jive, A Doong A Doong A, I'm A Virgin (1978), - 7" Single

The Mag/Spys
 Life Blood, Bombs (1980), - Split 7" single with The Obtainers

The Cure
 The Cure discography - All releases except Three Imaginary Boys, Boys Don't Cry, Japanese Whispers, The Top, Concert, and singles taken from those albums.

Fools Dance
(See Fools Dance discography)

Personal life
Gallup's older brother David Gallup was the manager for Lockjaw, while Ric Gallup was responsible for the promotional artwork of Lockjaw, the Mag/Spys, and (following Porl Thompson's departure from the original Easy Cure line-up) early art and design for the Cure, Ric also founded the Dance Fools Dance label, which released the Mag/Spys' only split-single release in 1980 (from the earlier Cult Hero sessions), and produced the animated short film Carnage Visors, which featured a soundtrack by the Cure and was screened in place of an opening band during the Cure's Picture Tour in 1981. Ric also designed promotional materials for Fools Dance, and was responsible for the band's lighting on tour. Since the mid-1980s, Gallup has also been the regular lighting designer/director for And Also the Trees.

Relationships
Simon Gallup's first marriage was to Carolé Joy Thompson, a former secretary who had also contributed backing vocals to the Mag/Spys recordings in 1979. They had two children together, Eden and Lily, before they divorced.

Simon met Sarah in Oxford, and they married in December 1997.  They have two children together, named Evangeline "Evie" Gallup, born 2000 and Ismay Gallup, born 2007. According to the Cure's Chain of Flowers newsletter, the title to the Mission's 2001 single "Evangeline" was dedicated by Wayne Hussey to Evie Gallup, although the lyrics were "about someone else altogether".

References

External links 
Simon at Pictures of You

The Cure members
English rock bass guitarists
Male bass guitarists
Alternative rock bass guitarists
English keyboardists
English male singers
English new wave musicians
British post-punk musicians
1960 births
Living people
People from Surrey